The West Franklin Historical Museum is operated by the West Franklin Historical District & Genealogical Society in Mulkeytown, Illinois.  

Its primary purpose is the preserve and protect the cultural heritage of the people, places and events of Western Franklin County, Illinois.

Collections
The museum consists of a collection of artifacts and memorabilia donations and loans, including accessions from cities, towns and villages, families and schools located in the Western Franklin County region.

Many of the communities, locations, people and families curated in the museum date to a time before Illinois attained statehood.

References

External links
 West Franklin Historical District & Genealogical Society - Visit Rend Lake

History museums in Illinois
Museums in Franklin County, Illinois